Ulysse Adjagba (born March 27, 1993) is a French professional basketball player who currently plays for Aix Maurienne of the LNB Pro B. He is a  tall point guard.

Professional career
Adjagba has played with the French Pro A League club Chalon/Saône.

References

French men's basketball players
1993 births
Sportspeople from Versailles, Yvelines
Living people
Point guards
Élan Chalon players